Stephen Addam Zeff (born July 26, 1933) is an American accounting historian, and Herbert S. Autrey Professor of Accounting at the Jesse H. Jones Graduate School of Business, Rice University, Houston, Texas, United States. He was inducted into the Accounting Hall of Fame in 2002.

Life and work 
Zeff was born in Chicago, IL, where his father ran a small industrial advertising agency. After his graduation from Highland Park High School in 1951, he went to the University of Colorado Boulder, where he obtained his BS in 1955 with a major in accountancy and his MA in 1957. He then moved to the University of Michigan, where he received his MBA in 1960 and his PhD in 1962. Recently he received an honorary doctorate in Economics from the Turku School of Economics and Business Administration, in Finland.

During his undergraduate years, Zeff worked as an editor for the Colorado Daily, the student newspaper. He became the newspaper's managing editor in his senior year. In 1955 he became an instructor at the University of Colorado, Boulder. At the University of Michigan, he taught accounting courses, was assistant of Herb Miller revisioning accounting books, and was research assistant at its Bureau of Industrial Relations. After his graduation in 1961, he was appointed Assistant Professor at Tulane University, and Associate Professor in 1963 and Professor of Accounting in 1966. In 1978 he moved to Rice University, where he is Herbert S. Autrey Professor of Accounting since 1979.

Over the years Zeff has been a visiting professor at the University of California at Berkeley, University of Chicago, Harvard Business School, Northwestern University, and the University of Texas at Austin. He has also been outside the United States in universities in Mexico, Australia, New Zealand, and the Netherlands.

Honors 
 In 1988, he received the American Accounting Association’s Outstanding Accounting Educator Award
In 1999 the AAA’s International Accounting Section named him the recipient of its International Accounting Educator Award
Hourglass Award, Academy of Accounting Historians, in both 1973 and 2001
Basil Yamey Prize, Accounting, Business & Financial History, 2004
The only non-British member of the academic panel of the Accounting Standards Board of the United Kingdom
From 1981 to 2004, he was the only non-European on the executive committee of the European Accounting Association
From 1991 to 2002, he was the International Accounting Adviser for the Institute of Chartered Accountants of Scotland, which recognized him as its Honorary Research Fellow in 2003
In 2002 he was inducted as the 70th member of Accounting Hall of Fame

Selected publications 
Zeff has authored and/or edited about 25 books and over 100 articles. Books, a selection:

 Zeff, Stephen A. The Accounting postulates and principles controversy of the 1960s, 1982.
 Zeff, Stephen A. Uses of accounting for small business. 1962.
 Zeff, Stephen A. The rise of economic consequences. Division of Research, Graduate School of Business Administration, Harvard University, 1978.

Articles, a selection:

 Zeff, Stephen A. "Forging accounting principles in five countries: A history and an analysis of trends" (1971).
 Dyckman, Thomas R., and Stephen A. Zeff. "Two decades of the Journal of Accounting Research". Journal of Accounting Research (1984): 225-297.
 Zeff, Stephen A. "Political lobbying on proposed standards: A challenge to the IASB". Accounting Horizons 16.1 (2002): 43-54.
 Zeff, Stephen A. "How the US accounting profession got where it is today: Part I". Accounting Horizons 17.3 (2003): 189-205.
 Zeff, Stephen A. "How the US accounting profession got where it is today: Part II". Accounting Horizons 17.4 (2003): 267-286.

References

External links
 Personal Page at Rice.
 Biography at OSU's Accounting Hall of Fame

1933 births
Living people
Rice University faculty
American economists
Harvard Business School faculty
University of California, Berkeley faculty
Ross School of Business alumni
University of Colorado alumni
University of Chicago faculty